José Enrique Sánchez Díaz (born 23 January 1986), known as José Enrique, is a Spanish former professional footballer who played as a left-back.

Starting his career with Levante, José Enrique was signed by their rivals Valencia and made La Liga appearances for Celta Vigo and Villarreal. He then spent nine years in England with Newcastle United and Liverpool, totalling 161 Premier League appearances. With the latter club, he won the Football League Cup and lost the FA Cup final in 2012. He retired through injury in 2017, after a year back in Spain with Real Zaragoza.

Club career

Early life and career
José Enrique was born in Valencia. He began his football career at hometown club Levante before being acquired by rivals Valencia, who sent him to Celta Vigo for a season-long loan. At the conclusion of this loan spell, he was signed by Villarreal in 2006.

Newcastle United
On 6 August 2007, José Enrique signed for English Premier League club Newcastle United for a fee believed to be £6.3 million. He signed a five-year contract with the club. He made his Newcastle debut on 29 August against Barnsley in which he played the full 90 minutes in a 2–0 victory, and his Premier League debut as a substitute against West Ham United on 23 September.

José Enrique's performances were rewarded when he was made the official Newcastle United Player of the Season for 2009–10, voted for by the fans. He also achieved the accolade of being named in the PFA Team of the Year alongside Newcastle teammates Fabricio Coloccini, Kevin Nolan and Andy Carroll. José Enrique scored his only goal for the club in a 2–0 league win over Nottingham Forest on 29 March 2010. He made 36 Premier League appearances for Newcastle in the 2010–11 season.

Liverpool

On 12 August 2011, José Enrique signed for Liverpool for a reported fee of £6 million. He made his debut two days later in Liverpool's first game of the 2011–12 Premier League season, starting in a 1–1 draw against Sunderland. On 26 February 2012, he helped Liverpool win the 2012 Football League Cup Final against Cardiff City, their first honour since 2006. On 1 April, he was forced to play as a goalkeeper for the remaining 13 minutes of the match against his old club Newcastle after Pepe Reina was sent off for headbutting James Perch. Although José Enrique kept a clean sheet, Liverpool, being down 2–0 at the time of Reina's red card, failed to level the score. He also played in the 2012 FA Cup Final on 5 May, a 2–1 loss to Chelsea.

On 17 November 2012, in a league match against Wigan Athletic, José Enrique scored his first goal for Liverpool in the 65th minute, having been increasingly reinvented as a left wing-back in a 3–5–2 formation under manager Brendan Rodgers. On 1 October 2014, he made his UEFA Champions League debut for Liverpool against Basel in Switzerland, playing the full 90 minutes in a 1–0 defeat. 

In his final three seasons at Liverpool, José Enrique made only 21 total appearances, 12 of which were in the league. He was hampered by a persistent injury to his right knee, and the side-effects of medication to deal with it. He captained the club in his final appearances, against Exeter City in the FA Cup in January 2016. José Enrique was released by Liverpool at the end of the 2015–16 season.

Real Zaragoza
On 7 September 2016, José Enrique signed for Segunda División club Real Zaragoza on a two-year contract. He made his debut on 8 October, playing the full 90 minutes of a 2–1 loss away to Sevilla Atlético, and scored his first goal on 5 November in a 2–2 draw away to RCD Mallorca.

On 6 September 2017, José Enrique announced his retirement from football due to a persistent knee injury.

Personal life
José Enrique was diagnosed with chordoma, a rare brain tumour, in May 2018. On 23 June 2018, he announced that he was recovering from surgery to remove a brain tumour. He stated, "I am now in recovery and so thankful. Life is too precious." In April 2019, he received the all-clear.

Career statistics

Honours
Newcastle United
Football League Championship: 2009–10

Liverpool
Football League Cup: 2011–12
FA Cup runner-up: 2011–12

Individual
PFA Team of the Year: 2009–10 Championship
Newcastle Player of The Year: 2010

References

External links

1986 births
Living people
Footballers from Valencia (city)
Spanish footballers
Association football defenders
Atlético Levante UD players
Valencia CF players
RC Celta de Vigo players
Villarreal CF players
Newcastle United F.C. players
Liverpool F.C. players
Real Zaragoza players
Segunda División B players
La Liga players
Premier League players
English Football League players
Segunda División players
FA Cup Final players
Spain youth international footballers
Spain under-21 international footballers
Spanish expatriate footballers
Expatriate footballers in England
Spanish expatriate sportspeople in England
Outfield association footballers who played in goal